State Road 435 (NM 435) is a  state highway in the US state of New Mexico. NM 435's northern terminus is at NM 12 in Reserve, and the southern terminus is a continuation as Reserve Beauerhead Road south-southwest of Reserve.

Major intersections

See also

References

435
Transportation in Catron County, New Mexico